Attributing the profession of journalist to a fictional character allows many possibilities for the author: reporters may travel extensively and face adventures (like Tintin), are among the first to have news of disasters and crimes (like Clark "Superman" Kent and Peter "Spider-Man" Parker), and are supposed to be good at establishing communication. Some journalist may also be recognized as heroes (like Ulala from Space Channel 5), and fix the mixed and negative reception of the profession from their respective fictional universe.

By country

Australia 
 Alex Burchill, reporter on Lowdown

 Martin "Marty" Di Stasio, senior reporter on the fictional TV current affairs show Frontline
 Libby Kennedy, from Australian soap opera Neighbours
 Susan Kennedy, from Australian soap opera Neighbours
 Mike Moore, anchor of Frontline
 Riley Parker, from Neighbours
 Scott Robinson from Neighbours;;
 Brooke Vandenberg, reporter on Frontline Austria 
 Brüno Gehard, fashion reporter featured in the mockumentary comedy film Brüno Belgium 
 Tintin, in Hergé's bande dessinée albums The Adventures of Tintin (French: Les Aventures de Tintin)
 Spirou and Fantasio, from the same comic series

 Canada 
Louis Ciccone, from Seeing ThingsCaitlin Ryan, from the Degrassi series

 Germany 
 Karla Kolumna, reporter appearing in two German children series: Bibi Blocksberg and Benjamin the Elephant

 Chile 
 Tulio Triviño, from Chilean puppet TV show 31 minutos Juan Carlos Bodoque, Mario Hugo, Balon Von Bola, Mico Micofono, Juanin Juan Harry, Patana Tufillo from 31 minutos France 
 Georges Duroy, Bel Amis main character
 Ulysse Mérou, journalist from Planet of the Apes Raymond Rambert, journalist from The Plague Joseph Rouletabille, in Gaston Leroux's novels

 Hong Kong 
 Lily Wong from comic strips

 Italy 
 Paparazzo, from Federico Fellini's film La Dolce Vita, origin of the term paparazzi Marcello Rubini, from La Dolce Vita Japan 
 Ulala, a reporter for Channel 5, the protagonist of the Space Channel 5 video games
Pudding, a rival reporter for Channel 42 who enjoys the limelight and fame, from the Space Channel 5 video games
Meiko Kurita, Washington correspondent for Hakura News Network, in Stephen Mertz's novel The Korean Intercept (2005)
Evila, a robotic replica of Ulala created to keep the truth from leaking and dubbed "The Ultimate Reporter", from the Space Channel 5 series
Spark Brushel, a freelance journalist that is a witness in Apollo Justice: Ace Attorney of the Ace Attorney series of video games

 Kazakhstan 
 Borat Sagdiyev, from the mockumentary comedy film Borat Mexico 
 Vicente Chambón, from the TV series Chespirito Sweden 
 Annika Bengtzon, in novels by Liza Marklund
 Mikael Blomkvist, from the Millennium series by Stieg Larsson

 United Kingdom 

 Individual journalists 
 Becky Burdock, from Jack Staff comics
 George Cragge, from In the Red and sequels by Mark Tavener
 Froud, from the novel Stowaway to Mars by John Wyndham
 Bridget Jones, from Helen Fielding's columns, novels and films
 Jack Parlabane, from the novels of Christopher Brookmyre
 Ford Prefect, from The Hitchhiker's Guide to the Galaxy series
 Katie Reed, from Kim Newman's Anno Dracula series
 Vivian Rook, from the Doctor Who episode "The Sound of Drums"
 Rita Skeeter, from the Harry Potter series
 Sarah Jane Smith, from the television series Doctor Who Jim Stevens, from the Inspector Rebus novels by Ian Rankin. 
 Mattie Storin, House of Cards Jasmine Thomas, Emmerdale Polly Becker, EastEnders Tony Hills, EastEnders William Boot, Scoop Thomas Fowler, The Quiet American John Dyson, Towards the End of the Morning Clint Smoker, Yellow Dog Rupert Psmith, Psmith, Journalist Groups of U.K. journalists 
 Ankh-Morpork Times staff in the Discworld novels: William de Worde, Sacharissa Cripslock, Otto Chriek and others
 Various staff from Broken News; Josh Cashman, Richard Pritchard, Katie Tate, Adam Lockwood, Frances Walsh, Anthony Markovitz and others
 GlobeLink News staff in Drop the Dead Donkey; Gus Hedges, George Dent, Helen Cooper, Sally Smedley, Henry Davenport, Damien Day and others
 Daily Express journalists Peter Stelling (played by Edward Judd) and Bill Maguire (played by Leo McKern), The Day the Earth Caught Fire United States 

 Individual journalists 
 Chick Adams, reporter in New York City played by Jack Weston, on the CBS sitcom My Sister Eileen (1960–1961)
 Ichabod Adams, former newspaper owner played by George Chandler on CBS's sitcom Ichabod and Me (1961–1962)
 Nick Alexander, reporter played by Nick Adams, on NBC's Saints and Sinners (1962)
 Amy Amanda "Triple A" Allen, reporter who covered The A-Team in the TV series by the same name
 Celeste Anders, reporter for the New York Express, played by Celeste Holm in the CBS sitcom Honestly, Celeste! (1954)
 Matt Anders, freelance anti-communist journalist at the height of the Cold War, played by Brian Keith in the 1955-1956 CBS adventure/drama Crusader Ben Andrews, police reporter in syndicated Manhunt, played from 1959 to 1961 by Patrick McVey
 Larry Appleton from Perfect Strangers Tally Atwater, broadcast journalist in the 1996 film Up Close & Personal Matt Bai, with Yahoo! News in the political thriller series House of Cards Billy Batson, radio news reporter and the secret identity of the comic book superhero Captain Marvel
 Ted Baxter, talking head from The Mary Tyler Moore Show Howard Beale, TV news anchor of the UBS Evening News, played by Peter Finch in the film Network D.X. Beaumont, magazine editor played by Raymond Bailey, on My Sister Eileen Paul Beltzer, magazine publisher played by James Philbrook, on CBS's The New Loretta Young Show Cy Bennett, editor of Today's World magazine, played by John Dehner on CBS's The Doris Day Show Maddy Bowen, reporter played by Jennifer Connelly in Blood Diamond Tom Bradford, editor and columnist of fictional Sacramento Register, modeled on novel by Tom Braden, played by Dick Van Patten on ABC's Eight Is Enough Carrie Bradshaw from Sex and the City TV series
 Kent Brockman from The Simpsons TV series
 Murphy Brown from the show of the same name, along with FYI staffers Jim Dial, Frank Fontana, Corky Sherwood, and Miles Silverberg
 Anson Bryson, Washington reporter, in William C. Heine's novel The Last Canadian (1974)
 Clint Buchanan from One Life to Live  soap opera
 Walter Burns, reporter played by Cary Grant in His Girl Friday Michelle Capra, columnist from Northern Exposure Snapper Carr, television news reporter in comic books and animated series featuring the Justice League
 Tess Mercer, executive editor and managing director of The Daily Planet played by Cassidy Freeman on TV series Smallville Ben Caxton, an investigative journalist in Robert Heinlein's novel Stranger in a Strange Land Miles Clarkson, music journalist from The Mephisto Waltz Harris Claibourne, editor of The Tombstone Epitaph, played by Richard Eastham on ABC series Tombstone Territory (1957–1960)
 Stephen Colbert, played by Stephen Colbert in The Colbert Report Emily Cowles, advice columnist, played by Ruth McDevitt on ABC's Kolchak: The Night Stalker Jefferson Crowley, newspaper editor played by Edmond O'Brien in "Gallegher" segments of NBC's Walt Disney's Wonderful World of Color Chloe Sullivan, former reporter for The Daily Planet, played by Allison Mack on TV series Smallville Pepper Dennis, in the show of the same name
 Bryan Denton, reporter for the New York Sun in Disney's musical Newsies Art Donovan, assistant city editor played by Jack Bannon, on Lou Grant Jefferson Drum, crusading frontier journalist played on the 1958 NBC series of the same name by Jeff Richards
 Brooke English, from All My Children soap opera
 George Faber, a Rome-based television journalist played by David Janssen in The Shoes of the Fisherman Vernon Fenwick, anchorwoman and cameraman for Channel 6 News in the Teenage Mutant Ninja Turtles universe
 I. M. Fletcher, investigative journalist from the Fletch series of novels by Gregory Mcdonald
 Jack Flood, newspaper researcher played by Robert Harland, on ABC's Target: The Corruptors! Mr. Fosdick, newspaper boss played by Charles Lane on the NBC series Dear Phoebe (1954–1955)
 Kermit the Frog from Sesame Street Grant Gabriel, former assistant editor of The Daily Planet, played by Michael Cassidy on TV series Smallville Gallegher, teenage cub reporter played by Roger Mobley, on NBC's Walt Disney's Wonderful World of Color (1964–1965)
 Walter 'Wichita' Garrett from The Return of Doctor X, 1939 film
 Pat Garrison, reporter for New York Record, played by Donald May on The Roaring 20's (1960–1962)
 Rory Gilmore, from Gilmore Girls Mark Grainger, editor played by John Larkin on NBC's Saints and Sinners Lou Grant, newspaperman on series also called Lou Grant and on the earlier The Mary Tyler Moore Show Ben Gregory, magazine writer played by Barry Coe, on ABC's Follow the Sun (1961–1962)
 Tom Grunick, TV news anchor played by William Hurt in the film Broadcast News Jackie Harvey, from The Onion Bill Hastings, writer of the advice-to-the-lovelorn column of the fictitious Los Angeles Daily Star, played by Peter Lawford, on NBC's Dear Phoebe (1954–1955)
 Nancy Hicks-Gribble, voiced by Ashley Gardner, a weather girl, and later anchor on Channel 84 in Arlen, Texas on King of the Hill Chris Higby, copy-boy of New York Record, played by Gary Vinson on The Roaring 20's 
 Jennifer Horton, from Days of Our Lives soap opera
 J. Jonah Jameson, newspaperman played by Robert F. Simon on The Amazing Spider-Man Rick Jason, magazine researcher played by Gary Lockwood on Follow the Sun Sierra Jennings, from the All About Us franchise
 Spider Jerusalem, the gonzo journalist of the future from the graphic novel Transmetropolitan Hildy Johnson, reporter played by Rosalind Russell in His Girl Friday Tom Jumbo-Grumbo, voiced by Keith Olbermann, blue whale anchor on BoJack Horseman Charles Foster Kane, newspaperman played by Orson Welles, in the film Citizen Kane Clark Kent, reporter for The Daily Planet by day and Superman off-duty, played by George Reeves in Adventures of Superman, Tom Welling on TV series Smallville and Henry Cavill in Man of Steel John King, TV reporter for CNN, on the US TV series House of Cards Kit Kittredge, amateur journalist from the American Girl series of books
 Klugie, photographer played by Richard Erdman, on Saints and SinnersAlexander Knox, reporter for the Gotham Globe in the 1989 film Batman Carl Kolchak, played by Darren McGavin on ABC's Kolchak: The Night Stalker Lois Lane, reporter for The Daily Planet, played first by Phyllis Coates and then Noel Neill, on Adventures of Superman; played by Erica Durance on Smallville John Larsen, owner of a comic book company, played by Jerome Cowan on The Tab Hunter ShowAdam MacLean, editor of Yellowstone Sentinel newspaper, played by Rex Reason on syndicated television series Man Without a Gun Robert "Bob" Major, newspaper owner played by Robert Sterling on CBS series Ichabod and Me Paul Marino, newspaper reporter played by Stephen McNally on Target: The Corruptors! Mark Markin, INN/CNN reporter in Lash-Up (2001 novella/2015 novel by Larry Bond)
 Monique Marmelstein, intern reporter, played by Carol Ann Susi on ABC's Kolchak: The Night Stalker Doris Martin, journalist for magazine Today's World, played by Doris Day on CBS's The Doris Day Show Steve Martin, reporter for United World News, played by Raymond Burr in the films Godzilla, King of the Monsters! (1956) and Godzilla 1985 (1985)
 Christine Massey, magazine writer played by Loretta Young on The New Loretta Young Show Willie Maxwell, reporter in Center City, Iowa, played by Eddie Applegate on NBC's Nancy (1970)
 Jack McEvoy in Michael Connelly's 1996 mystery novel The Poet Will McAvoy, anchor and managing editor of "News Night", played by Jeff Daniels on HBO's The Newsroom Jack McGee, reporter for The National Register on The Incredible Hulk Percy "P.C.M." Mercy, editor of View magazine, in Allen Drury's novel The Throne of Saturn (1971)
 Sam Miller, publisher of the Wilcox Clarion of Wilcox, Arizona, in five episodes of the western series 26 Men (1957–1959)
 William Miller, teenage aspiring rock journalist, played by Patrick Fugit in Almost Famous Trudy Monk, San Francisco journalist and late wife of Adrian Monk in the TV series Monk Morbo the Annihilator, voiced by Maurice LaMarche, the belligerent alien co-anchor of The  News on Futurama Paul Morgan, cartoonist played by Tab Hunter on NBC's The Tab Hunter Show (1960–1961)
 Les Nessman, from WKRP in Cincinnati
 Billie Newman, reporter played by Linda Kelsey, on Lou Grant Trevor Newsworthy from The Fresh Prince of Bel-Air TV series
 Tyra Nordbo from the Man-Kzin Wars Scott Norris, reporter of New York Record, played by Rex Reason on ABC's The Roaring 20's Bill Norton, New York Herald reporter in Eric Frank Russell's novel, Dreadful Sanctuary (1948)
 Jimmy Olsen, photographer for The Daily Planet, played by Jack Larson on Adventures of Superman and by Aaron Ashmore on TV series Smallville Kelly O'Donnell, non-fictional anchor/reporter for NBC News, making guest appearance on US House of Cards April O'Neil, anchorwoman for Channel 6 News in the 1987-1996 animated Teenage Mutant Ninja Turtles series
 Nic Pappas, in Peter J. Gallanis's 2014 mystery novel The Reporter, Part I - Rise and Fall Dion Patrick, Irish American newspaperman played by Adam Kennedy, on NBC's The Californians (1957–1958)
 Dick Preston, radio host in Arizona, played by Dick Van Dyke on CBS's The New Dick Van Dyke Show Miranda Priestly, fashion magazine editor, played by Meryl Streep in The Devil Wears Prada Sweet Polly Purebred, reporter for TTV in the television series Underdog; her boss was O.J. Skweez
 Margaret Pynchon, elitist publisher played by Nancy Marchand on Lou Grant Lloyd Ramsey, small-town newspaper editor played by Ford Rainey, in Robert Young's CBS sitcom Window on Main Street Mickey Riley, sports writer at the fictitious Los Angeles Daily Star, played by Marcia Henderson, on NBC's Dear Phoebe, 1954–1955
 Jack Ryder, journalist and alter-ego of the Creeper, superhero and occasional ally of Batman
 Andrea Sachs, aspiring journalist, played by Anne Hathaway in The Devil Wears Prada Vic Sage in The Question series from the DC Universe superhero comics
 Murray Scarvi, columnist and radio commentator opposed to the Apollo program, in William R. Shelton's novel Stowaway to the Moon: The Camelot Odyssey (1973)
 Robin Scherbatsky, news anchor for New York cable news channel Metro News 1 in the sitcom How I Met Your Mother; famous for her use of the filler words "but, um" in that order, and falling in horse manure on live television
 Lou Sheldon, city editor of New York Globe, played by Gary Merrill on CBS's The Reporter (1964)
 Ruth Sherwood, magazine writer played by Elaine Stritch on My Sister Eileen Diane Simmons, anchor on the TV show Family Guy Sabrina Spellman in the TV show Sabrina the Teenage Witch Brenda Starr, reporter for the Chicago newspaper The Flash from the Brenda Starr comic strip and movies
 Dave Tabak, copy editor played by Robert F. Simon on NBC's Saints and Sinners Tricia Takanawa, reporter on Family Guy Chloe Talbot, on The Simpsons, Marge's high school chum who goes on to be a famous journalist
 Danny Taylor, reporter for New York Globe, played by Harry Guardino on The Reporter Paul Templin, magazine writer played by Brett Halsey on Follow the Sun Tom Tucker, news anchor on Family Guy Hal Towne, newspaper columnist on CBS's The Dennis O'Keefe Show, with Dennis O'Keefe in the featured role
 Abby Townsend, press secretary to the First Lady of the United States, played by Celeste Holm on NBC's Nancy Frankly Unctuous, TV newscaster, in The Throne of Saturn (1971)
 Ron Updyke, disdainful reporter, played by Jack Grinnage on ABC's Kolchak: The Night Stalker Vicki Vale in the Batman series from the DC Universe superhero comics and the 1989 film
 Linda van Schoonhoven, voiced by Tress MacNeille, is the perky human blonde co-anchor of The  News on Futurama Dan Vasser, reporter on Journeyman Tony Vincenzo, newspaper editor, played by Simon Oakland on ABC's Kolchak: The Night Stalker Bob Wallace, son of the newspaper editor, played by Scott McKay on CBS's Honestly, Celeste! Mr. Wallace, newspaper editor, played by Geoffrey Lumb (1905–1990) on CBS's Honestly, Celeste! Nicole Walker, from Days of Our Lives soap opera 
 John Boy Walton, modeled on Earl Hamner, Jr., played by Richard Thomas and Robert Wightman on CBS's The Waltons Herb Welch, veteran reporter on Saturday Night Live, played by Bill Hader
 Trinity Wells in the television series Doctor Who and The Sarah Jane Adventures Perry White, editor-in-chief of the Daily Planet, played by John Hamilton on Adventures of Superman Francis Wilde, photographer played by Randy Boone on CBS's western Cimarron Strip Cameron "Buck" Williams, played by Kirk Cameron in the original film Left Behind and by Chad Michael Murray in the 2014 version of Left Behind Duke William, journalist with New York Record, played by John Dehner on The Roaring 20's Steve Wilson, in CBS' Big Town, managing editor of The Illustrated Press in a large American city, played from 1950 to 1954 by Patrick McVey
 Jamie Campbell in the television series ZooJack Deveraux played by Mathew Ashford, on Days of our Lives, Soap Opera.
Sarah Jane Smith, played by Elizabeth Sladen, on Doctor Who/The Sarah Jane Adventures.
Kara Zor'El / Kara Danvers (By day) Super Girl by night, in the television series "Supergirl".
Kat Grant, editor of Catco Media, played by Calista Flockhart, Kara Danver's first boss, in season one of Supergirl.
Kate Ripperton, voiced by Asta Parry, in several stories and editions of the Dark Shadows Audio drama series by Big Finish Productions.

 Groups of U.S. journalists 
 Daily Bugle staff in the Spider-Man series: J. Jonah Jameson, Peter Parker, Betty Brant Leeds, Ned Leeds, Frederick Foswell, Robbie Robertson, Ben Urich, Lance Bannon and others from the Marvel Universe superhero comics, then passed onto comic strips, TV series and films
 Daily Planet and Galaxy Broadcasting staff in the Superman series: Clark Kent, Lois Lane, Jimmy Olsen, Perry White, Lana Lang, Morgan Edge and others from DC Comics US superhero comics, then passed onto comic strips, television series, and films
 The Lone Gunmen, aka Melvin Frohike, Richard "Ringo" Langly and John Fitzgerald Byers, who cover conspiracies in their self-titled magazine and The Magic Bullet on The X-Files and their own spinoff series, The Lone Gunmen San Diego Channel Four News Team in the movie Anchorman: The Legend of Ron Burgundy : Ron Burgundy, anchorman, alongside co-anchor Veronica Corningstone, weatherman Brick Tamland, sportscaster Champ Kind, and field reporter Brian Fantana; Burgundy's rival from Channel Two is Wes Mantooth
 Fictional newspaper Lush For Life''s entire staff
The Palatine Star, located in the fictional city of Palatine, Ill. Series: Reporter, by Peter J. Gallanis

Notes

References

External links
 Information on the image of the journalist in popular culture, at ijpc.org

 
Fictional journalists, List of
Journalists, List of fictional